Sympistis occata, the harrow moth, is a species of moth in the family Noctuidae (the owlet moths).

The MONA or Hodges number for Sympistis occata is 10101.

References

Further reading

 
 
 

occata
Articles created by Qbugbot
Moths described in 1875